Miguel Ángel "Migue" Leal Díaz (born 1 February 1997) is a Spanish footballer who plays as a right back for Villarreal CF B.

Club career
Born in Villarreal, Valencian Community, Leal joined Villarreal CF's youth setup at the age of five. He made his senior debut with the C-team on 9 May 2015, aged 18, by playing the last 16 minutes of a 1–4 Tercera División home loss against Atlético Levante UD.

On 14 August 2018, after establishing himself as a regular starter for the C's, Leal moved to Segunda División B side Real Murcia on a one-year loan. He moved back to his parent club the following 24 January, after appearing rarely, and was assigned to the reserves also in the third division.

Leal made his first team debut on 18 December 2019, starting in a 5–0 away routing of Comillas CF for the season's Copa del Rey. On 19 September of the following year, he moved to FC Groningen on loan for one year.

Leal made his Eredivisie debut on 25 September 2020, coming on as a second-half substitute for Bart van Hintum in a 1–3 loss at FC Twente.

Career statistics

Club

References

External links

1997 births
Living people
People from Villarreal
Sportspeople from the Province of Castellón
Spanish footballers
Footballers from the Valencian Community
Association football defenders
Primera Federación players
Segunda División B players
Tercera División players
Villarreal CF C players
Villarreal CF B players
Real Murcia players
Villarreal CF players
Eredivisie players
FC Groningen players
Spanish expatriate footballers
Spanish expatriate sportspeople in the Netherlands
Expatriate footballers in the Netherlands